is a Japanese footballer who plays as a midfielder.

Career

Professional
Imura signed with Richmond Kickers in March 2015 through the club's open tryout.

Honors
Individual
 USL All-League Second Team: 2016

References

External links

 
 Richmond Kickers profile

1991 births
Living people
Japanese footballers
Richmond Kickers players
Association football defenders
USL Championship players
Association football midfielders
Association football people from Tokyo Metropolis
People from Musashino, Tokyo